Lohara is a village in Munger District, in the state of Bihar, India. Administratively it is under Bangama gram panchayat, Tetia Bambar Tehsil of Munger District. Lohara is located 9.5 km by road southeast of Kharagpur and 47 km by road south of Munger.

Demographics
In the 2001 India census, the village of Lohara had a population of 779, with 429 males (55.1%) and 350 females (44.9%), for a gender ratio of 816 females per thousand males.

Notes

Villages in Munger district